Skycity or Sky City may refer to:

SkyCity, a restaurant atop the Space Needle in Seattle, Washington, US
Sky City (shopping mall), a shopping mall in Zhubei, Hsinchu County, Taiwan
Sky City (store), a defunct American retail chain
Sky City (Changsha), a cancelled skyscraper, previously planned to be built in Changsha, China
Skycity (Mandaluyong), a skyscraper in Mandaluyong, Philippines
Skycity Entertainment Group, a New Zealand-based casino corporation
Acoma Pueblo or Sky City, a town in New Mexico, US
Sky City, a part of Stockholm Arlanda Airport, Sweden
Hong Kong SkyCity, near Hong Kong International Airport
 Sky City (album)

See also
Sky City 1000, a Japanese urban development program